The Leora's stream salamander or ajolote (Ambystoma leorae) is a rare species of mole salamander in the family Ambystomatidae. It is endemic to a very small area of land in the Iztaccihuatl-Popocatepetl National Park on the border of the State of Mexico with Puebla, with a single known population on Mount Tlaloc. Its very specific requirements as regards water quality militates against its survival in a habitat where water is being extracted, cattle graze and the salamander has traditionally been eaten as food. It has been listed as a threatened species by the Mexican Government and as "critically endangered" by the International Union for Conservation of Nature.

Distribution
This species is endemic to the Sierra Nevada in central Mexico. It was historically restricted to six locations in the Iztaccihuatl-Popocatepetl National Park (IPNP) located on the border of the State of Mexico with Puebla. Long ago it disappeared from the heavily polluted Rio Frio where it was first found. A recent research rediscovered a new and relict locality of A. leorae, possibly the last one (Sunny et al. 2014a). The new study reports that the critically endangered species persists in a single population on Mount Tlaloc, located adjacent to Mexico City, one of the largest and most densely urbanized area on earth.

Habitat
The salamanders were found in two small streams (2 m wide, 6.5 m depth) with cold water temperature (12 to 15 °C), highly elevated oxygenation water level (78% dissolved oxygen) surrounded by small alpine grassland (Muhlenbergia sp.) and mountain forest (Pinus hartwegii and Abies religiosa). The study show low genetic diversity but high average heterozygosity, and three genetic subpopulations were recognized in the restricted geographic range (Sunny et al. 2014a).

Conservation status
Because of the species limited distribution, the clearance of the forest, and the pollution and consumption of the water by
humans, it is classified by the IUCN as a critically endangered species (Shaffer et al. 2004) and as a threatened species by the Mexican government (SEMARNAT 2010). In the geographic distribution of the species, there are several threats that are modifying the ecosystem, including alteration of the stream to collect the water for human consumption, introduction of cattle, and the direct collection of specimens for traditional food (Sunny et al. 2014b).

References

 SEMARNAT (2010) Norma Oficial Mexicana NOM-059-SEMARNAT-2010, Protección ambiental-Especies nativas de México de flora y fauna silvestres-Categorías de riesgo y especificaciones para su inclusión, exclusión o cambio. Lista de especies en riesgo. Diario Oficial de la Federación, 10 diciembre 2010, México
 Sunny A, Monroy-Vilchis O, Fajardo V, Aguilera-Reyes U (2014a) Genetic diversity and structure of an endemic and critically endangered stream river salamander (Caudata: Ambystoma leorae) in Mexico. Conserv Genet 15: 49–59.
 Sunny A, Monroy-Vilchis O, Reyna-Valencia C, Zarco-González MM (2014b) Microhabitat Types Promote the Genetic Structure of a Micro-Endemic and Critically Endangered Mole Salamander (Ambystoma leorae) of Central Mexico. PLoS ONE, 9, e103595 doi:101371/journalpone0103595.
 Taylor EH (1943) Herpetological novelties from Mexico. Univ Kanas Sci Bull 29:343–361

Mole salamanders
Taxonomy articles created by Polbot
Amphibians described in 1943